Heini Weber (2 November 1923 – 27 April 2010) was a German wrestler. He competed in two events at the 1952 Summer Olympics.

References

External links
 

1923 births
2010 deaths
German male sport wrestlers
Olympic wrestlers of Germany
Wrestlers at the 1952 Summer Olympics
People from Neumarkt in der Oberpfalz
Sportspeople from the Upper Palatinate